Nebria hybrida is a species of ground beetle in the Nebriinae subfamily that is endemic to Bulgaria.

References

External links
Nebria hybrida at Fauna Europaea

hybrida
Beetles of Europe
Endemic fauna of Bulgaria
Beetles described in 1876